Charadra pata is a moth of the family Noctuidae. It is known only from Guatemala City in Guatemala.

Nothing is known of the biology, although the larvae possibly feed on oak.

External links
The North American species of Charadra Walker, with a revision of the Charadra pata (Druce) group (Noctuidae, Pantheinae)

Pantheinae
Moths described in 1894